Renault is a manufacturer of Cognac, founded in 1835 by Jean-Antonin Renault in the town of Cognac, France. Jean Antonin Renault was a great voyager, and he started to sell cognac during his travels to Scandinavia, Germany, Eastern Europe, Iceland, the Americas, and Asia. Renault was the first cognac maker to ship his cognac in bottles (instead of barrels) which guaranteed the preservation of original taste and uniform quality.

The corporation has merged with Castillon and Bisquit Dubouché, and is based at Rouillac, Charente, a small village near Château de Lignères. In 2010 Finnish Altia Plc acquired the Renault brand.

A well-known product with international distribution is "Renault Carte Noir". The iconic Carte Noire blend was created in 1876 making it one of the oldest cognac recipes still in use.

References

External links
 http://www.cognacrenault.com/ Company website

Distilleries in France
Cognac